Grandma Prisbrey's Bottle Village, also known as Bottle Village, is an art environment, located in Simi Valley, California. It was created by Tressa "Grandma" Prisbrey (1896–1988) from the 1950s to the 1970s.  Prisbey built a "village" of shrines, walkways, sculptures, and buildings from recycled items and discards from the local landfill.

Bottle Village has been designated as a historical landmark by the City of Simi Valley, County of Ventura, and State of California (California Historical Landmark No. 939. It was also listed on the National Register of Historic Places in 1996.

Bottle Village closed in 1984 and was severely damaged during the 1994 Northridge earthquake.

Tressa "Grandma" Prisbrey
Tressa Luella Schaefer was born in Easton, Minnesota in 1896. She attended school until the age of twelve and studied mostly politics in North Dakota. At the age of 15, Prisbrey married the ex-husband of her sister, Theodore Grinolds who was 37 years her senior (52 years old). The marriage with Theodore only lasted 14 years and within those years she bore seven children. After Theodore's passing at age 72, Prisbrey and her seven children moved up to Seattle where she married an unnamed and unemployed man. Their marriage was very short lived. Over the course of her life, she had witnessed the passing of six out of her seven children (4 boys, 2 girls).

In 1946, Prisbrey made the move to Santa Susana, now a neighborhood in Simi Valley, California. Ten years after the move, Prisbrey met her husband, Al Prisbrey who bought one-third of an acre located on Cochran Street. They brought in a trailer to live in, removed the tires, and hid them in an effort to stay grounded on the lot. When Prisbrey first moved to Santa Susana, she had a large collection of 17,000 pencils which had previously been her hobby. In an effort to find a place to put them, she decided she wanted to make a house for her pencils to stay. At the age of 60, she began looking around to buy cinder-blocks to build with but came to discover the prices were way out of her range. They had spent all their money paying for the property so she resorted to visiting a local dump where she found thousands of colored bottles. She began going to her sister, Hattie's house and made cement by hand and built her first bottle house. Prisbrey mentioned she did not begin this project to gain attention but as an outpost as well as a place to keep all of her things. She was interested in the fact that everything has a purpose and is special and unique and that is exactly what she brings to bottle village. Not just in the visuals but the overall feeling you receive from being present.

The Village was very much established by 1961 but Prisbrey kept adding structures and tweaking into the 1980s. She moved away in 1972, but later came back to live in a trailer alongside the village where she continued adding sculptures and flower planters.

In 1982 Prisbrey, in poor health, left Simi Valley to live with her daughter and son-in-law in San Francisco. In July 1986 the property was gift deeded to the Preserve Bottle Village committee. In October 1988, Prisbrey died from complications of a stroke at a convalescent hospital in San Francisco.

Bottle Village
After starting with a wall, she continued to build until she had constructed 16 buildings and structures made of glass and assorted other materials, a mosaic sidewalk, the Leaning Tower of Bottle Village, the Dolls Head Shrine, Cleopatra's Bedroom, the Round House, and more. The Los Angeles Times described Bottle Village as an "eccentric folk-art wonderland."

Bottle Village is seen by art historians and folklorists as a complex work combining the desires of an elderly lady to provide simple shelter for her valued personal collections; memorialize family, friends, and important life events; grieve over the loss of family members; entertain visitors; and leave behind a testament to her very personal vision, exuberance, and inspiration. Bottle Village is a significant folk art environment created by an American folk artist of high acclaim. It is a rarity created out of actual mass consumer throwaway from everyday lives of Americans of the late 1950s and early 1960s.

When building Bottle Village, no help was given and everything is made from hand and all recycled materials. One of the shrines is called The Headlight Garden. This garden was made for her then 35-year-old daughter who had been diagnosed with cancer. Her daughter loved flowers so Prisbrey decided to make her a rose garden made out of headlights and recycled materials. Before her daughter's passing, she would love to wake up every morning and sit by the garden in silence. According to Prisbrey, the day her daughter died, the roses died.

There are heart, diamond, and spade stepping stones that symbolize when Prisbrey visited Las Vegas, Nevada. She made the forms out of cement but then filled them with random recycled things like scissors. Bottle Village also has wishing wells made from tiles, ground is paved with recyclables, a doll shrine, and a leaning tower of bottles. Each building has its own theme. A doll house was built to house Prisbrey's doll collection which held 600 dolls. Prisbrey mentioned every day she would go into that house and dress up some of the dolls.

"Anyone can do something with a million dollars. Look at Disney," Prisbrey once said. "But it takes more than money to make something out of nothing, and look at the fun I have doing it." When visitors would come to Bottle Village when Prisbrey was still alive, she would first take them on a tour but then end in her meditation room where she would allow them to meditate as well as listen to her sing different songs. She would charge only 75 cents a visit but people would frequently give her more.

Earthquake and funding
The 1994 Northridge earthquake struck eight miles away and badly damaged the Village. Because of the severe damage, the Preserve Bottle Village committee applied for Federal Emergency Management Agency (FEMA) funding, receiving almost US$500,000.  In 1997, when it appeared FEMA would award a $455,000 grant to help repair the village after the earthquake, the grant was lost after former Councilwoman Sandi Webb and U.S. Rep. Elton Gallegly, R-Simi Valley, opposed it. Gallegly called it a waste of taxpayers' money. Also, James Lee Witt, the director of the Federal Emergency Management Agency, said his organization had determined that the site was not eligible for Federal disaster relief money because it had not been open to the general public since 1984. The Simi Valley Historical Society and Rancho Simi Recreation and Park District allocated about $150,000 to restore an apricot pitting shed. The City of Simi Valley also contributed at least $24,000 through Community Development Block Grant funds to restore the 1920s wood shed with concrete pillars, a remnant of the area's apricot industry.

Ever since the 1994 Northridge earthquake, Bottle Village has been in need of support and funding. The late artist Joanne Johnson wrote that the “crumbling Bottle Village is an ironic paradox – built from castoffs, now cast aside," who was  one of the docents, on the board of directions and served for some time as the president on the board. This piece of Folk Art is the definition of the saying “one man's treasure is another man's junk,” because of the disrepair the site is in now, there is very little activity.  There are very few people who can still give scheduled tours of the village so personal tours are difficult to book but there are monthly private tours people can sign up to attend at www.bottlevillage.com.

Preserve Bottle village continues preservation efforts, speaking with private foundations. It has received a few generous grants in the past 15 years,  from the Larry Janss – School of the Pacific Islands Foundation ($21,000), the Rothschild Foundation ($15,000), and the Gareth Evans - Golden Rule Foundation ($10,000 + $5,000).

Bottle Village is a nonprofit group that owns and oversees the property.

In popular culture

The Village inspired a 32-page children's book Bottle Houses: The Creative World of Grandma Prisbrey by Melissa Eskridge Slaymaker.

She is commemorated every year during Halloween at the Simi Valley Strathearn Park Ghost Tour, which tells the history of Simi Valley.

Exhibitions
1974–1976
"Naives and Visionaries", sponsored by the National Endowment for the Arts and the Walker Art Center, Minneapolis, MN

1975
"America Now", sponsored by the U.S. Information Agency (traveling European exhibition)

1976
"Grandma Prisbrey", Woman's Building, Los Angeles, CA (solo exhibition)

1977
"In Celebration of Ourselves", Museum of Modern Art, San Francisco, CA

1979–1981
"A Look at the Art of the 70's", sponsored by the International Communication Agency (traveling exhibition)

1984
"Visions of Paradise", Beyond Baroque, Venice, CA
"Bits and Pieces: The Dream-builders of California", Chevron Art Gallery, San Francisco, CA

1985
"Divine Disorder: Folk Art Environments of California", Triton Museum of Art, Santa Clara, CA (traveling exhibition)

1985–1986
"A Time to Reap", Co-sponsored by Seton Hall Univ. NJ, & the Museum of American Folk Art, NY (traveling exhibition)

1986
"Cat and a Ball on a Waterfall: 200 Years of California Painting and Sculpture", Oakland Museum, Oakland, CA

1988
"Not so Naive: Bay Area Artists and Outsider Art", San Francisco Craft & Folk Art Museum, San Francisco, CA

1989
"Forty Years of California Assemblage", UCLA Whyte Gallery, Los Angeles, CA (traveling exhibition)
"Women in American Architecture", Pacific Design Center, Los Angeles, CA (traveling exhibition)

1990
"Ageless", the Woman's Building, Los Angeles, CA

1992
"Reflections of Bottle Village", Simi Valley Cultural Center, Simi Valley, CA

1995
"Visions from the Left Coast" Santa Barbara Contemporary Arts Forum, Santa Barbara, CA

1996–1999
"Recycled-Reseen" Santa Fe Museum of Art, Santa Fe, New Mexico (traveling)

2000
Outsider Art window display, Hennessy + Ingalls, Santa Monica, CA

Gallery of images

See also
List of Registered Historic Places in Ventura County, California
 Ventura County Historic Landmarks & Points of Interest

References

Relevant literature
 Rosen, Seymour. 1979. "In Celebration of Ourselves." California Living Books in conjunction with San Francisco Museum of Modern Art. 176 pages. 
 Wojcik, Daniel. 2017. Outsider Art: Visionary Worlds and Trauma. Jackson: University Press of Mississippi. 304 pages.

External links 

Official Bottle Village website
Bottle Village, official Facebook page
YouTube.com: Bottle Village Channel videos – with site tours, interviews, + "Pave the Way−Bottle Village Walkway of Fame".
 http://spacesarchives.org/explore/collection/environment/grandma-prisbreys-bottle-village/.

American folk art
Buildings and structures in Simi Valley, California
Visionary environments
Outsider artists
Women outsider artists
Landmarks in Ventura County, California
Museums in Ventura County, California
Parks in Ventura County, California
Buildings and structures completed in 1982
California Historical Landmarks
Buildings and structures on the National Register of Historic Places in California
Historic districts on the National Register of Historic Places in California
National Register of Historic Places in Ventura County, California
20th-century American artists
20th-century American women artists
Bottles
Culture of Simi Valley, California
History of Ventura County, California
Vernacular architecture in California
Bottle houses